Zoran Milinković (Зоран Милинковић; born 26 September 1956) was the presidential candidate of the Patriots of the Serbian Diaspora in the 2004 Serbian presidential election.

He was born in Kraljevo, but from 1980th lives in Paris and he led anti-NATO demonstrations in France.

He is the owner of Yu Business World review.

References

1956 births
Living people
Politicians from Kraljevo
Candidates for President of Serbia